Batman: Arkham Unhinged is an American comic book series published by DC Comics. Like the previous anthology, Batman: Arkham City, it acts as a tie-in to the events of the video game Batman: Arkham City, with stories set before and during the events of the game. Originally published online as 58 'chapters', it was later published in print as 20 issues. Chapters #1-43 were written by Derek Fridolfs and chapters #44-58 by Karen Traviss with a number of different artists.

Storylines

Collected editions

References

External links
 BATMAN: ARKHAM UNHINGED

2011 comics debuts
Batman titles
Comics based on video games
Works based on Warner Bros. video games
Batman: Arkham